In constrained optimization, a field of mathematics,  a barrier function is a continuous function whose value on a point increases to infinity as the point approaches the boundary of the feasible region of an optimization problem. Such functions are used to replace inequality constraints by a penalizing term in the objective function that is easier to handle.

The two most common types of barrier functions are inverse barrier functions and logarithmic barrier functions. Resumption of interest in logarithmic barrier functions was motivated by their connection with primal-dual interior point methods.

Motivation
Consider the following constrained optimization problem:

minimize 
subject to 

where  is some constant. If one wishes to remove the inequality constraint, the problem can be re-formulated as

minimize ,
where  if , and zero otherwise.

This problem is equivalent to the first. It gets rid of the inequality, but introduces the issue that the penalty function , and therefore the objective function , is discontinuous, preventing the use of calculus to solve it.

A barrier function, now, is a continuous approximation  to  that tends to infinity as  approaches  from above. Using such a function, a new optimization problem is formulated, viz.

minimize 

where  is a free parameter. This problem is not equivalent to the original, but as  approaches zero, it becomes an ever-better approximation.

Logarithmic barrier function

For logarithmic barrier functions,  is defined as  when  and  otherwise (in 1 dimension. See below for a definition in higher dimensions). This essentially relies on the fact that  tends to negative infinity as  tends to 0.

Logarithmic barrier functions may be favored over less computationally expensive inverse barrier functions depending on the function being optimized.

Higher dimensions

Extending to higher dimensions is simple, provided each dimension is independent.

Formal definition
Minimize  subject to 

Assume strictly feasible: 

Define logarithmic barrier

See also
 Penalty method
 Augmented Lagrangian method

References

External links
 Lecture 14: Barrier method from Professor Lieven Vandenberghe of UCLA

Constraint programming
Convex optimization
Types of functions